Panyassis of Halicarnassus, sometimes known as Panyasis, was a 5th-century BC Greek epic poet from Halicarnassus in the Persian Empire (modern-day Bodrum, Turkey).

Life 
Panyassis was the son of Polyarchus from Halicarnassus, but the historian Duris of Samos claimed that Panyasis was the son of Diocles and from Samos. In addition, the historian Herodotus was either his nephew or his cousin. There was also another person of the same name, possibly the grandson of the poet, who wrote a work in two books on dreams.

In 454 BC, Panyassis was executed for political activities by the tyrant of Halicarnassus and grandson of Artemisia, Lygdamis ΙΙ, after an unsuccessful uprising against him.

Panyasis was ranked by the Alexandrian School with the great epic poets.

The Suda encyclopedia mentions Panyassis.

Works 
Panyassis enjoyed relatively little critical appreciation during his lifetime, but was posthumously recognised as one of the greatest poets of archaic Greece. His most famous works are: the Heracleia about the hero Heracles, written in epic hexameter, and the Ionica about the histories of the Ionian cities of Asia Minor, reportedly written in pentameter. These works are preserved today only in fragments. It is believed that he also wrote other works which have since been lost.

References

Ancient Halicarnassians
Ancient Greeks from the Achaemenid Empire
Early Greek epic poets
5th-century BC Greek people
5th-century BC poets
Executed ancient Greek people
5th-century BC executions
Year of birth unknown
Year of death unknown